Aleksandar Aleksandrov (b. October 31, 1984 - Sofia ) is a Bulgarian amateur boxer who fought at the 2012 Olympics at junior fly.

At the 2012 Summer Olympics he beat Juliano Máquina from Mozambique, then edged out Korean Shin Jong-Hun 15:14 but lost to Thai Kaeo Pongprayoon 10:16 in the quarter finals.

References

1984 births
Living people
Boxers at the 2012 Summer Olympics
Olympic boxers of Bulgaria
Sportspeople from Sofia
Bulgarian male boxers
AIBA World Boxing Championships medalists
Light-flyweight boxers